Yuki Kobayashi may refer to:

, Japanese cross-country skier
, Japanese footballer
, Japanese footballer
, Japanese footballer